Decatur Township is a township in Decatur County, Iowa, USA.  As of the 2000 census, its population was 425.

Geography
Decatur Township covers an area of 35.77 square miles (92.65 square kilometers); of this, 0.14 square miles (0.35 square kilometers) or 0.38 percent is water. The streams of Long Creek and Marks Branch run through this township.

Cities and towns
 Decatur City

Adjacent townships
 Long Creek Township (north)
 Franklin Township (northeast)
 Center Township (east)
 Eden Township (southeast)
 Burrell Township (south)
 Bloomington Township (southwest)
 Grand River Township (west)
 Richland Township (northwest)

Cemeteries
The township contains six cemeteries: Cash, Decatur City, Palenstine, Shy, Waller and Woodmansee.

Major highways
 Interstate 35

References
 U.S. Board on Geographic Names (GNIS)
 United States Census Bureau cartographic boundary files

External links
 US-Counties.com
 City-Data.com

Townships in Decatur County, Iowa
Townships in Iowa